Axel Thorsen (1810/1814–1863) was a Norske Kanonskonnert built in Trondheim, and launched on 28 April 1810.  She was one of ten such ships built in either Bergen or Trondheim for the Danish-Norwegian navy before the end of the Napoleonic Wars (and English Wars) when Norway became independent of Denmark at the Treaty of Kiel in 1814.

Origin of Name
Axel Thorsen is a character in very old Danish folk tales and poetry

Danish Service
Axel Thorsen, along with her sister gunships Nornen and  Valkyrien joined Müller's Finmark Squadron in 1810

Norwegian Service
Axel Thorsen was used in fisheries protection until 1839, and commercially thereafter. 
In 1864 this ship took part in the Swedish expedition to Spitzbergen led by Baron Nordenskiöld.

Fate
She was lost in the Arctic Ocean off Novaya Zemlya in August 1872.

Citations and references
Citations

References
Fra Krigens Tid (1807 -1814) (From the wartime) edited by N A Larson, Christiana (Oslo) 1878. (Title page and Chapter headings )
Oehlenschläger: Gamle danske Folkeviser, Kiøbenhavn 1840 Berlingske Bogtrukkeri (on Google Books)

Ships of the Royal Dano-Norwegian Navy
Ships of the Royal Norwegian Navy
Schooners
Ships built in Trondheim
1810 ships
Maritime incidents in August 1872